Nabhan is a surname. Notable people with the surname include:

Gary Paul Nabhan (born 1952), American agricultural Ecologist, Ethnobotanist, Ecumenical Franciscan Brother and author
Jassim Al-Nabhan (born 1944), Kuwaiti actor
Saleh Ali Saleh Nabhan (1979–2009), Kenyan born leader of al-Qaeda in Somalia
Walid Nabhan (born 1966), Maltese writer and translator of Palestinian-Jordanian origin
Lara Nabhan (born 1989) lebanese journalist

See also 
Sawadiya - Nabhan, a Syrian village